Skinners may refer to:

 Skinners' Academy, a secondary school in Woodberry Down, Hackney, London, England
 The Skinners' School, an all-boys grammar school in Royal Tunbridge Wells, Kent, England
 Skinners' Dairy, a family-run dairy in and around Jacksonville, Florida, from 1922 until 1995
 Skinners Family Hotel, a heritage-listed former pub and now retail optometrist shop in Sydney, New South Wales, Australia
 39 (Skinners) Signal Regiment, an Army Reserve regiment of the British Army
 Skinners Gap, a mountain pass in West Virginia, United States

See also
 Worshipful Company of Skinners, one of the Livery Companies of the City of London
 Skinner (disambiguation)